Neophylax kolodskii, or Kolodski's caddisfly, is a species of caddisfly in the family Thremmatidae. It is found in North America.

References

Trichoptera
Articles created by Qbugbot
Insects described in 2000